Judo and Blind Judo at the 2017 Islamic Solidarity Games was held at the Heydar Aliyev Arena in  Baku, Azerbaijan from May 13 to May 15, 2017.

Medalists

Men

Women

Paralympic judo

Medal table

References

External links

 Official website
 

Islamic Solidarity Games
2017 Islamic Solidarity Games
Islamic Solidarity Games
2017